India competed at the 1960 Summer Olympics in Rome, Italy. 45 competitors, all men, took part in 20 events in 6 sports. India won its only medal in men's Field Hockey. Milkha Singh misses bronze medal by finishing 4th in Men's 400m in athletics.

Medalists

Competitors

Athletics
8 Athletes represents India in 1960 Summer Olympics. Milkha Singh finished second in all of the 400m rounds prior to the final, improving his time on each occasion. In the final he finished fourth with a time of 45.6, this being a decision that required a photo-finish. His finishing position was not bettered by an Indian track athlete until the 1984 Olympics.
Men
Track and Road Events

Field Events

Football

Group D

Field hockey

India played a few practice matches leading into the group stage games. They defeated Great Britain 8–0 on 22 August and Australia 5–2 three days later. This was the first time since 1928 that the Men's team failed to achieve a gold medal in field hockey. They lost 1-0 to Pakistan  by a goal Ahmad nasir to secure the second position. 

Team Roster:

 Joseph Antic
 Leslie Claudius
 Jaman Lal Sharma
 Mohinder Lal
 Shankar Lakshman
 John Peter
 Govind Sawant
 Raghbir Singh Bhola
 Udham Singh Kullar
 Charanjit Singh
 Jaswant Singh
 Joginder Singh
 Prithipal Singh
Summary

Shooting

Three shooters represented India in 1960.

Weightlifting

Wrestling

Men's freestyle

References

External links
Official Olympic Reports
International Olympic Committee results database

Nations at the 1960 Summer Olympics
1960